is a railway station in the city of Shimada, Shizuoka Prefecture, Japan,  operated by the Ōigawa Railway. Its location was formerly the town of Kawane, which was merged into Shimada in 2008.

Lines
Owada Station is on the Ōigawa Main Line and is 14.8 from the terminus of the line at Kanaya Station.

Station layout
The station has a single side platform. There is no station building. The station is unattended.

Adjacent stations

|-
!colspan=5|Ōigawa Railway

Station history
Owada Station was opened on July 1, 1969.

Passenger statistics
In fiscal 2017, the station was used by an average of 9 passengers daily (boarding passengers only).

Surrounding area
Oi River
Japan National Route 473

See also
 List of Railway Stations in Japan

References

External links

 Ōigawa Railway home page

Stations of Ōigawa Railway
Railway stations in Shizuoka Prefecture
Railway stations in Japan opened in 1969
Shimada, Shizuoka